Anatoly Morozov may refer to:
 Anatoly Morozov (pilot) (19161944), Soviet World War II pilot and Hero of the Soviet Union
 Anatoly Morozov (scientist) (born 1939), Ukrainian scientist
 Anatoly Morozov (athlete) (born 1973), Russian football player